Yäş Köç is a rural locality (a posyolok) in Biektaw District, Tatarstan. The population was 31 as of 2010.

Geography 
Yäş Köç is located 12 km west of Biektaw, district's administrative centre, and 33 km north of Qazan, republic's capital, by road.

History 
The village was established in 1920.

Since its establishmant was a part of Arça Canton. After the creation of districts in Tatar ASSR (Tatarstan) in Qazan (1930–1935), Biektaw (1935–1963),  Yäşel Üzän (1963–1965) and Biektaw districts.

References

External links 
 

Rural localities in Vysokogorsky District